The Filmfare Best Actor Award is given by the Filmfare magazine as part of its annual Filmfare Awards South for Kannada films The Award was first given in 1972. The 2018 winner of the award is Yash for K.G.F: Chapter 1. As of 2021, Rajkumar leads the list with 8 wins followed by Anant Nag with 6 wins.

Superlatives

Highest Awards

 Rajkumar - 8 Awards
 Anant Nag - 6 Awards
 Vishnuvardhan, Shiva Rajkumar, Puneeth Rajkumar - 4 Awards
 Sudeepa - 3 Awards
 Lokesh, Ramesh Aravind, Ganesh, Prem, Yash - 2 Awards

Hattrick Awards

 Rajkumar (1984, 1985 & 1986)
 Anant Nag (1989, 1990 & 1991)
 Sudeepa (2001, 2002 & 2003)

Winners

References

Actor